Paragnorima fuscescens is a moth in the family Drepanidae. It was described by George Hampson in 1893. It is found in India, Nepal, China (Sichuan, Yunnan, Tibet), Vietnam, Thailand and Myanmar.

The wingspan is about 40 mm. The forewings are dull brown suffused with fuscous and with traces of numerous waved dark lines. There is a pale speck below the median nervure near the base and an indistinct dark spot on the discocellulars, as well as a pale patch at the apex. The hindwings are pale fuscous with an indistinct paler band just beyond the middle.

References

Moths described in 1893
Thyatirinae
Moths of Asia